The 2011 Summit League men's basketball tournament was the 2011 post-season tournament for Summit League, an NCAA Division I athletic conference. It was won by regular season champion Oakland University. It took place March 5–8, 2011 at the Sioux Falls Arena in Sioux Falls, South Dakota.

Format
Out of the league's 10 teams, the top eight received berths in the conference tournament.  After the 18-game conference season, teams were seeded by conference record, with tiebreakers used if necessary in the following order:
 Head-to-head competition
 Winning percentage vs. ranked conference teams (starting with #1 and moving down until the tie is broken)
 Ratings Percentage Index
 Coin flip

Bracket
All Times Central

References

Tournament
Summit League men's basketball tournament
Basketball competitions in Sioux Falls, South Dakota
College basketball tournaments in South Dakota